The 1973 Pittsburgh Panthers football team represented the University of Pittsburgh in the 1973 NCAA Division I football season. The Panthers competed in the Fiesta Bowl.

Schedule

Roster

Coaching staff

Team players drafted into the NFL

References

Pittsburgh
Pittsburgh Panthers football seasons
Pittsburgh Panthers football